Vytautas Apanavičius (born 12 March 1973) is a Lithuanian former football midfielder. He played nineteen games for the Lithuania national football team, scoring no goals. Apanavičius also played in Latvia and Russia.

Honours
National Team
 Baltic Cup
 1992

References

1973 births
Living people
Lithuanian footballers
Lithuania international footballers
Association football midfielders
Lithuanian expatriate footballers
Expatriate footballers in Latvia
Expatriate footballers in Russia
FK Ekranas players
FBK Kaunas footballers
FC Baltika Kaliningrad players
Russian Premier League players
Daugava Rīga players
FK Atlantas players
Lithuanian expatriate sportspeople in Latvia